Lysa Hora is a village in Pervomaisk Raion of Mykolaiv Oblast, Ukraine, located at . It belongs to Myhiia rural hromada, one of the hromadas of Ukraine. 

Lysa Hora has a population of 4502 people. Body of local self-government - Lysa Hora village Rada.
The village was  founded  in 1751 year. In those times the watch winterer of the Zaporizhzhya cossacks appeared Lysa Hora, that was the well fixed outpost.

People
 Viktor Dobrovolsky
 Mykola Shytyuk

References

Yelisavetgradsky Uyezd

Villages in Pervomaisk Raion